The Battle of Blavet (French: Bataille du Blavet) was an encounter between the Huguenot forces of Soubise and a French fleet under the Duke of Nevers in Blavet harbour (Port de Blavet, modern Port-Louis), Brittany in January 1625, triggering the Second Huguenot rebellion against the Crown of France.

Background

An important Huguenot rebellion against the pro-Catholic King of France Louis XIII had taken place a few years before, in 1621-1622, ending in stalemate and in the sealing of the Treaty of Montpellier.

Resentment was breeding on the Huguenot side however as King Louis XIII was not respecting the clauses of the Treaty of Montpellier. Not a single condition is said to have been respected, as Toiras was reinforcing the fortification of Fort Louis, instead of dismantling it, right under the walls of the Huguenot stronghold of La Rochelle, and as a strong fleet was being prepared in Blavet for the eventuality of a siege of the city. The threat of a future siege on the city of La Rochelle was obvious, both to Soubise and the people of La Rochelle.

At the same time the Huguenots and Soubise were very defiant of the Crown,  displaying intentions to become independent on the model of the Dutch Republic: "If the citizens, abandoned to their guidance, were threatened in their rights and creeds, they would imitate the Dutch in their resistance to Spain, and defy all the power of the monarchy to reduce them." (Mercure de France)

A fleet of five warships was being prepared at Blavet, for a future blockade of the city of La Rochelle. Emissaries were sent to Paris to obtain the execution of the Treaty of Montpellier, but in vain.

Soubise resolved to take action. With a few ships which he had prepared at Chef de Baye, near La Rochelle, he set sail, and attacked Blavet in January 1625. He had 12 small boats, 300 well-armed soldiers, and 100 sailors. Six Royal great ships were at anchor, "all well armed with cannon, but lacking men and ammunition".

Soubise captured the fleet by surprise, and became master of the city, including taking possession of La Vierge, the largest known warship of the period: it weighed 500 tons, had 80 bronze cannons, and had cost 200,000 crowns to build.

The Duke of Vendôme, Commander of the Province, attempted to block Soubise in the harbour, with heavy chain and batteries. After two weeks however, Soubise managed to break through with his fleet.

Soubise, now in possession of a formidable fleet of 70 ships, then anchored in front of Île de Ré, which he had occupied with his troops.
 
These events led to a strong reaction from the King, who set up a counter-attack in September 1625, leading to the Capture of Île de Ré, and with Soubise fleeing to England. Soubise would return two years later with a large fleet under the Duke of Buckingham, leading to the final showdown of the Siege of La Rochelle (1627–1628).

See also
 French Wars of Religion
 Huguenot rebellions

Notes

References
 Eyre Evans Crowe The history of France Longman, Brown, Green, Longmans, and Roberts, 1863
 Jack Alden Clarke Huguenot warrior: the life and times of Henri de Rohan, 1579-1638 Springer, 1967 
 Yves-Marie Bercé, Richard Rex The birth of absolutism: a history of France, 1598-1661 Palgrave Macmillan, 1996 

Blavet
1625 in France
Blavet
Blavet
History of Morbihan